A list of American films released in 1996.

Highest-grossing

A

B-C

D-G

H-J

K-M

N-Q

R-S

T-Z

See also
 1996 in American television
 1996 in the United States

Notes

References

External links

 
 List of 1996 box office number-one films in the United States

1996
Films
Lists of 1996 films by country or language